State Route 227 (SR 227) is a state highway in the U.S. state of California and located in San Luis Obispo County. It is an alternate route of U.S. Route 101 between Arroyo Grande and the city of San Luis Obispo, serving the community of Edna and San Luis Obispo County Regional Airport. There is also an unconstructed routing from Route 1 south of Oceano to its present terminus in Arroyo Grande.

Route description
SR 227 starts at the intersection of US 101 and Grand Ave./Branch St. in Arroyo Grande. It travels east on Branch St. through the Village, which is the historic downtown section of Arroyo Grande. The route then turns north onto Corbett Canyon Rd. After a short distance, the road turns onto Carpenter Canyon Rd. The route leaves Arroyo Grande, and enters a more rural setting. It continues north, winding through the rolling hills. At Edna, the road’s name changes to Edna Rd. This is also the location of Price Canyon Rd, a county road which goes to Pismo Beach. The route continues north and enters the city of San Luis Obispo near the airport. The road’s name changes to Broad St. The route continues north through flat, urban setting. At South St, it turns west towards its terminus at US 101. The route turns south onto Higuera St, then west onto Madonna Rd, before it terminates at US 101.

The southernmost portion of SR 227 is part of the National Highway System, a network of highways that are considered essential to the country's economy, defense, and mobility by the Federal Highway Administration.

History
SR 227 was adopted as a state route in 1933 as Legislative Route 147. It was an unsigned highway running from LRN 2 near Arroyo Grande to LRN 2 near San Luis Obispo (LRN 2 is currently known as US 101). In 1964 during the renumber of California state routes, LRN 147 became SR 227, and became a signed route. However, except for the new route number, the highway did not change. In 1968, a southern extension to SR 1 south of Oceano was added to its definition. That extension has never been constructed.

Future
Increasing traffic on the route, especially during peak periods, has required improving capacity on the highway. Some sections of the road are located in places where widening could be difficult. Two different proposals are being considered, in which one or both might be implemented. The two portions which are potential problems are the portion running through the Village in Arroyo Grande (which is the historic downtown), and the road between Arroyo Grande and Edna.

The first proposal is to build a new road around the Village to the south. This would require a new connection with US 101 (or possibly use an existing interchange on another road). It would also require a new alignment for a future connection with SR 1, if that unconstructed portion remains in the route definition. The second proposal would remove the route completely from Arroyo Grande. Because of the terrain between Arroyo Grande and Edna, it was proposed by the county to move the state route to another road which would be easier to expand. The proposal would move SR 227 onto Price Canyon Rd. at Edna. This would move the terminus to US 101 or SR 1 in Pismo Beach instead of Arroyo Grande. It is not known when either of these proposals would be implemented.

Major intersections

See also

References

External links

Caltrans: Route 227 highway conditions
California Highways: Route 227
California @ AARoads.com - State Route 227

227
State Route 227
Arroyo Grande, California
San Luis Obispo, California